"Suicide Blonde" is the lead single from Australian rock band INXS's seventh studio album, X (1990). It was released on 22 August 1990 in the United States and on 3 September 1990 in the United Kingdom. The song reached number two in Australia, number nine in the United States, and number 11 in the United Kingdom. In Canada and New Zealand, the single peaked at number one for two and three weeks, respectively. At the APRA Music Awards of 1991, "Suicide Blonde" won the award Most Performed Australian Work Overseas.

"Suicide Blonde" would be the final song performed live in front of an audience by Hutchence with INXS, on 27 September 1997 in Pittsburgh, Pennsylvania, before his death on 22 November 1997.

Writing and recording
"Suicide Blonde" was written by INXS members Michael Hutchence and Andrew Farriss, after the band had gotten back together after a year-long sabbatical in 1989. The song's title originates from the night Hutchence and then-girlfriend Kylie Minogue attended the debut of the 1989 romantic drama film The Delinquents, which stars Minogue. For the premiere, she wore a blonde wig whose colour she called "suicide blonde".

The recording of "Suicide Blonde" showed some new and older influences on INXS. Jon Farriss's drums show the influence of dance music especially the acid house sounds popular in the UK. Similarly, the blues harp intro on the track, performed by Charlie Musselwhite, was sampled rather than recorded live.

Chart performance
In the United States, the track reached a peak of number nine on the Billboard Hot 100, and it topped both the Album Rock Tracks and Modern Rock Tracks charts. A dance remix of the track received wide airplay on US top-forty stations, allowing it to reach the top 10 on the Hot Dance Club Play chart. On the UK Singles Chart the single reached a peak of number 11, while on the Australian Singles Chart it reached number two. In Canada and New Zealand, "Suicide Blonde" reached number one for two and three weeks respectively.

Track listings

7-inch and cassette single
 "Suicide Blonde" – 3:55
 "Everybody Wants U Tonight" – 5:08

UK CD single
 "Suicide Blonde" (7-inch version)
 "Suicide Blonde" (Demolition mix)
 "Everybody Wants U Tonight"
 "Suicide Blonde" (7-inch Nik mix)

US maxi-CD single
 "Suicide Blonde" (7-inch mix) – 3:54
 "Suicide Blonde" (Earth mix) – 5:39
 "Suicide Blonde" (Devastation mix) – 6:19
 "Suicide Blonde" (Milk mix) – 5:40
 "Suicide Blonde" (Demolition mix) – 6:53
 "Everybody Wants U Tonight" – 5:09

Charts

Weekly charts

Year-end charts

Decade-end charts

Certifications

Release history

See also
 List of number-one singles of 1990 (Canada)
 List of number-one singles from the 1990s (New Zealand)
 List of Billboard Mainstream Rock number-one songs of the 1990s
 List of Billboard number-one alternative singles of the 1990s

References

 [ Allmusic.com song article on Suicide Blonde]
 [http://www.mtv.com/news/articles/1430358/19971124/story.j\Billboard Magazine, 16 February 1991]
 "INXS: X Marks the Spot" Rolling Stone'' Issue 590 1 November 1990 page 85

1990 songs
1990 singles
APRA Award winners
Atlantic Records singles
INXS songs
Mercury Records singles
Number-one singles in New Zealand
RPM Top Singles number-one singles
Song recordings produced by Chris Thomas (record producer)
Songs written by Andrew Farriss
Songs written by Michael Hutchence
Warner Music Group singles